Höringen is a municipality in the Donnersbergkreis district, in Rhineland-Palatinate, Germany.

References

Municipalities in Rhineland-Palatinate
Donnersbergkreis